Kinosternon arizonense is an extinct species of mud turtle in the genus Kinosternon. Initially described by Charles W. Gilmore in 1922. In 2016 McCord examined available Pliocene material of K. arizonense and concluded that the fossil material differs significantly from the extant turtles. Joyce and Bourque (2016) concurred. Rhodin et al. (2017), listed Kinosternon arizonense as extinct.

References

Bibliography

Pliocene turtles
Pleistocene turtles
Extinct turtles
Fossil taxa described in 1922
arizonense